Cetopsorhamdia is a genus of three-barbeled catfishes native to South America.

Species 
These are the currently recognized species in this genus:
 Cetopsorhamdia boquillae C. H. Eigenmann, 1922
 Cetopsorhamdia filamentosa Fowler, 1945
 Cetopsorhamdia hidalgoi Dario R. Faustino-Fuster & Lesley S. de Souza, 2021.
 Cetopsorhamdia iheringi Schubart & A. L. Gomes, 1959
 Cetopsorhamdia insidiosa (Steindachner, 1915)
 Cetopsorhamdia molinae Miles, 1943
 Cetopsorhamdia nasus C. H. Eigenmann & Fisher, 1916
 Cetopsorhamdia orinoco L. P. Schultz, 1944
 Cetopsorhamdia phantasia D. J. Stewart, 1985
 Cetopsorhamdia picklei L. P. Schultz, 1944

References

Heptapteridae
Fish of South America
Catfish genera
Taxa named by Carl H. Eigenmann
Freshwater fish genera